Anaphosia caloxantha is a moth of the  subfamily Arctiinae. It was described by Hering in 1932. It is found in the Democratic Republic of Congo.

References

Moths described in 1932
Lithosiini
Insects of the Democratic Republic of the Congo
Moths of Africa
Endemic fauna of the Democratic Republic of the Congo